Sarathan Records is an indie rock record label based in Seattle, Washington. The label was formed in 2005 by Jonathan Kochmer, a member of indie band Two Loons For Tea.

Artists 
Airpushers
Shane Bartell
Chrisopher Blue
The Purrs
Sensation Junkies
Abra Moore
Lisbeth Scott
Jason Trachtenburg
Trachtenburg Family Slideshow Players
Two Loons For Tea
Peter Bradley Adams
Feral Children
War Tapes

See also 
 List of record labels

External links

Record labels established in 2005
American independent record labels
Indie rock record labels